The Independent Healthcare Providers Network (IHPN), formerly known as the NHS Partners Network, is a representative body for independent sector healthcare providers in the United Kingdom.

The body was formed in 2005 to provide a voice for private health companies, and was initially made up of organisations involved in the government’s Independent Sector Treatment Centre programme. It is part of the NHS Confederation, an independent membership body for organisations in the National Health Service.

The members of the IHPN are independent healthcare providers including large hospital groups, diagnostics providers, third-sector organisations and providers of primary, community and dental care. They include not-for-profit providers.

Organisation
Following a vote at the 2007 NHS Confederation Annual Conference, the network became part of the NHS Confederation. Since Autumn 2008 its membership has expanded to include independent sector healthcare organisations providing NHS patient care in primary and community care, in addition to diagnostics and acute and elective surgery.

David Hare has been chief executive since November 2013, when he replaced David Worskett. The organisation has a strategic council which includes leaders of some of its largest members.

Response to 2020 pandemic 
In March 2020, the IHPN brokered the block-booking by NHS England of almost all services and facilities at the country's private hospitals.

Members
Organisations that are or have been members of the Network include:
 3Well Medical – run Botolph Bridge Community Health Centre in Peterborough
Alliance Medical – provide medical imaging services
 Alliance Health Group
 Assura Group Ltd – a property development company specialising in primary care
 Barchester Healthcare
 Baxter Healthcare
Bupa UK
 Care UK
Circle Health Group – subsidiary of Centene Corporation
 Connect Health – specialist community provider of musculoskeletal physiotherapy services to the NHS
General Healthcare Group, owner of BMI Healthcare
 Harmoni CPO Ltd – now part of Care UK
 Horder Healthcare
 InHealth Group
 Interhealth Canada
 Oasis Dental Care Limited – now part of Bupa
 Pfizer Health Solutions UK
 Ramsay Health Care UK
 UK Specialist Hospitals Ltd – now part of Care UK
 UnitedHealth UK
 Vanguard Healthcare

References

External links 

 

Private providers of NHS services
Health care industry trade groups based in the United Kingdom